The 2012 FIBA Africa Under-18 Championship for Women (alternatively the Afrobasket U18) was the 12th U-18 FIBA Africa championship, played under the auspices of the Fédération Internationale de Basketball, the world basketball sport governing body and qualified for the 2013 World Cup. The tournament was held from September 20–29 in Dakar, Senegal, contested by 6 national teams and won by Senegal.

The tournament qualified the winner and the runner-up for the 2013 FIBA Under-19 World Championship for Women.

Participating teams

Squads

Preliminary round

Knockout round
Championship bracket

5th place match

Semifinals

Bronze medal game

Gold medal game

Final standings

Senegal rosterAminata Faye, Aminata Kamara, Maissa Sylla, Mame Diallo, Mame Ndiaye, Mame Ndiaye, Mame Sy, Ndeye Dieng, Ndeye Diagne, Ndeye Kebe, Yacine Diop, Coach: Birahim Gaye

Statistical Leaders

Awards

All-Tournament Team

 Yacine Diop
 Soraia Deghady
 Mariam Kone
 Houda Hamrouni
 Aminata Traore

References

External links
Official website

FIBA Africa Under-18 Championship for Women
2012 in African basketball
2012 in Senegalese sport
2012 in youth sport
FIBA